Nenad Bilbija (born 6 February 1984) is a professional handball player, currently playing for GWD Minden. Recently, he represented Slovenia at 2013 World Men's Handball Championship.

References

External links

1984 births
Living people
Slovenian male handball players
Slovenian people of Serbian descent
Place of birth missing (living people)
21st-century Slovenian people